Kim Kötter (born 27 July 1982, Losser, Overijssel) is a Dutch director, model and beauty pageant titleholder. She was crowned Miss Universe Nederland 2002, and competed in the Miss Universe 2002 pageant where she placed 11th in the preliminaries, missing the top 10 by one spot. She also competed in the Miss Europe 2002 pageant where she placed 3rd runner up. Kötter currently runs her own modelling agency, and is the organizer of the Miss Overijssel, Miss Nederland and Miss Universe Germany beauty pageants. In  2011, Kötter competed on the Dutch version of the television show Fort Boyard.

See also
 List of modeling agencies

References

External links
 
Models by Kim Kötter Kötter's modelling agency (Dutch) 
 

1982 births
Beauty pageant hosts
Beauty pageant owners
Dutch beauty pageant winners
Dutch female models
Living people
Miss Europe
Miss Universe 2002 contestants
Modeling agencies
People from Losser
21st-century Dutch women